Abak Prithibi is a 1959 Bengali film directed by Bishu Chakraborty. This film was produced by Tarun Kumar, who was also a Bengali film actor. This film was written by Bishu Chakraborty. The music was composed by Amal Mukherjee. This is a comedy drama film. The film stars Uttam Kumar in lead and others Ajit Bandyopadhyay, Gangapada Basu, Bidhayak Bhattacharya, Swagata Chakraborty, Tulsi Chakraborty, Nripati Chatterjee, Sabitri Chatterjee, Aparna Debi, Tarun Kumar, Priti Majumdar and Bireswar Sen played supporting role. Uttam Kumar playing here a thief role which is very unique.

Plot
Arjun is a very lonely person. He doesn't know what life is. Every day for him is a struggle. So he becomes a criminal. Jail is a safe custody for him because food is always available in jail. So he tries to return to the place, but all his efforts go in vain, then he travels to a place and meets a father. He is the principal of a missionary residential school. In that place Arjun meets Miss Chaterjee, a teacher. At first she doesn't like him, but shortly she started to realise Arjun's quality. Arjun is an also a very good singer, but again for his bad reputation police catches him and send him to the jail. In court some students actually support him and thus all the misunderstanding is solved and the truth prevails.

Cast
 Uttam Kumar
 Ajit Bandyopadhyay
 Gangapada Basu
 Bidhayak Bhattacharya
 Swagata Chakraborty
 Tulsi Chakraborty
 Nripati Chatterjee
 Sabitri Chatterjee
 Aparna Debi
 Tarun Kumar
 Priti Majumdar

Soundtrack

References

External links
 

Bengali-language Indian films
1959 films
1950s Bengali-language films